Harper is an unincorporated community in Malheur County, Oregon, United States. Although it is unincorporated, it has a post office with a ZIP code 97906.  Harper lies off U.S. Route 20 southwest of Vale.

Demographics

Climate
Harper has a continental cold desert climate (Köppen BWk), with cold, snowy winters and hot, sunny summers.

Transportation
In the 21st century, Harper is a stop on the Eastern POINT intercity bus line between Bend and Ontario. It makes one stop per day in each direction.

Education
It is in the Harper School District 66.

References

Unincorporated communities in Malheur County, Oregon
Census-designated places in Oregon
Unincorporated communities in Oregon